= Manchester City (disambiguation) =

Manchester City is an English Premier League football club.

Manchester City may also refer to:

- Manchester City W.F.C., a women's football club
- Manchester, a city in England
